Peltigera neckeri is a foliose lichen in the family Peltigeraceae. It is commonly called black saddle pelt. It is distinguished by its unique tubular apothecia, which resemble black saddles or painted finger nails.

Ecology
Peltigera neckeri is found throughout temperate and boreal regions of North America, Europe, and Asia. It is terrestrial, and almost exclusively found on bare soil or mosses.

References

neckeri
Lichen species
Lichens of North America
Lichens of Canada
Lichens of Europe
Lichens of Asia
Lichens described in 1862
Taxa named by Johannes Müller Argoviensis
Fungi without expected TNC conservation status